Backbone is the debut album by British pop punk band Roam.

Production
Recording took place at Steel City Studio in Sheffield, Futureworks Studios in Manchester and Mill Bank Farm Studios in East Sussex. Drew Lawson produced the album. Phil Gornell engineered the proceedings with assistance from Grant Berry, Oliver Horner and Rian Dawson. Matt Wilson of Set Your Goals/Chains provides guest vocals on "Deadweight". Elliott Ingham performs additional drums. Lawson mixed the album, while Berry mastered it.

Promotion
On 11 October 2015, a music video for "Deadweight" was released. On 13 December 2015, a music video for "Hopeless Case" was released.
On 9 March 2016, a music video for "Tracks" was released.

Release
The album was released on 22 January 2016 through Hopeless. The band is set to go on the 2016 Warped Tour. In April and May 2017, the band supported As It Is on their first US headlining tour.

Critical reception

Backbone charted at number 178 in the UK.

Track listing
All lyrics and music by Roam.

Personnel
Personnel per sleeve.

Roam
 Alex Costello – lead vocals  
 Alex Adam – vocals, lead guitar
 Sam Veness – rhythm guitar
 Matt Roskilly – bass
 Charlie Pearson – drums

Additional musicians
 Elliott Ingham – additional drums
 Matt Wilson (Set Your Goals/Chains) – guest vocals on "Deadweight"

Production
 Drew Lawson – producer, mixing
 Phil Gornell – engineer
 Grant Berry – assistant engineer, mastering
 Oliver Horner – assistant engineer
 Rian Dawson – assistant engineer
 Jordan Pryke – artwork
 Elliott Ingham – photographs

Chart performance

References
Citations

Sources

 
 

2016 albums
Hopeless Records albums
Roam (band) albums